Lester John Castle  (13 July 1921 – 26 November 1986) was the Chief Ombudsman of New Zealand from 1984 to 1986. In this role, he was responsible for investigating complaints against central and local government agencies, including Ministers of the Crown.

Castle was born in Wellington in 1921. He was the son of Sydney Castle, also a lawyer, and attended Christ's College, Christchurch and Victoria University College, graduating LLB in 1947. He became a Wellington solicitor, Council member and President of both Wellington Law Society and the New Zealand Law Society. He was appointed an ombudsman in 1977, and Chief Ombudsman in 1984, holding this position until his death in Wellington on 26 November 1986.

Castle was appointed a Companion of the Order of St Michael and St George in the 1977 Queen's Silver Jubilee and Birthday Honours, and was awarded the Queen Elizabeth II Silver Jubilee Medal the same year.

References

1921 births
1986 deaths
New Zealand Companions of the Order of St Michael and St George
20th-century New Zealand lawyers
People from Wellington City
People educated at Christ's College, Christchurch
Victoria University of Wellington alumni